Edward Henty (28 March 1810 – 14 August 1878), was a pioneer British colonist and is regarded as the first permanent settler in the Port Phillip district (later known as the colony of Victoria), Australia.

Early life and family background
Edward was born in Tarring, West Sussex, England, the fourth surviving son of Thomas Henty, who came of a well-known Sussex banking family, and his wife Frances Elizabeth Hopkins of Poling, West Sussex. His father inherited £30,000 and bought the property generally called the Church Farm at West Tarring, and bred high value Merino sheep, some of which were purchased by capitalist entrepreneurs in the Australian colonies such as John Macarthur. After an economic downturn hit England in the mid 1820s, Edward's eldest brother James Henty thought that better opportunities for the family existed in Australia. In 1829 James travelled to the Swan River Colony with two other brothers, Stephen and John. Edward remained Sussex, studying and assisting his father with his business interests there.

Van Diemen's Land
Edward's brothers in the west of Australia had a difficult time obtaining grants to productive land and decided to move to Launceston in Van Diemen's Land where their prospects would likely improve. In the meanwhile their father, Thomas Henty, decided to bring the rest of the family to the Australian colonies, selling most of his assets in England and sailing for Launceston. He arrived in April 1832 with Edward and the three remaining siblings Charles, Jane and Francis.

Portland
It was difficult to find suitable land in Tasmania and Edward was sent to explore the coast of the mainland. He reported that the district near Portland Bay had good possibilities, and after revisiting it with his father, it was decided that the land was suitable for settlement. Edward went first on the Thistle with labourers, stock, potatoes and seed. After a voyage of 34 days the Thistle arrived at Portland Bay on 19 November 1834 at 8 a.m. Edward Henty told the anecdote,

The second vessel brought Mr. Francis Henty, who landed on 11 December and in course of time Mr. Stephen and Mr. Thomas followed. Sheep were fetched across from Tasmania, pastures occupied, houses erected and land cultivated. The Henty brothers also engaged on bay whaling at Portland in the 1830s. The whale oil and baleen taken from southern right whales was shipped to Tasmania for export to London.

The British government had been keen to have land taken up in Western Australia and the Hentys had assumed no objections would be raised to their obtaining land in the Port Phillip district. The application was first made in 1834 and negotiations continued for many years. The father, Thomas Henty, died in 1839, and it was not until 1846 that the matter was finally settled, when the Hentys were allowed £348 for improvements at the port, and were granted  of land valued at £1290. The remainder of their land they had to buy at auction. The attitude of the government at Sydney to new settlers may be illustrated by an extract from a dispatch of the governor, Sir George Gipps, to Lord John Russell, dated 11 April 1840.  The thought that the many thousands of pounds spent by the Hentys in developing the country might eventually be of benefit to the state had apparently not entered into the minds of the authorities. Neither could they have anticipated that the first sale of crown lands which took place a few months later would yield the sum of £17,245.

Edward Henty was determined to continue with his settlement; his brother, Francis, had joined him in December 1834, and during the next five years other members of the family joined him, and gradually all of their horses, cattle and sheep were transferred from Tasmania. On 29 August 1836 the exploring party headed by Major Thomas Livingstone Mitchell reached Portland Bay and were amazed to find the country already colonised. In later years Edward Henty was fond of telling the story of Major Mitchell when he came to a hut, from which blows of a hammer rang, saying, "Where is Mr Henty, my man," and the reply of the burly blacksmith, "Here he is at your service." From Major Mitchell Henty learned the character of the land to the north, and gradually he was able to acquire more land. In 1845 he had over 70,000 acres (280 km²). Sometimes the price of wool and sheep fell very low and it was impossible to sell either to advantage; but over the years the stations prospered.

In 1855 Edward Henty was elected a member of the Victorian Legislative Assembly for Normanby and was re-elected in 1859. He was defeated in 1861 and did not sit again in parliament. Henty's last years were spent in retirement at his Melbourne mansion 'Offington' and he died on 14 August 1878. In October 1840 he married Annie Maria Gallie who survived him. They had no children.

Edward Henty in addition to being the first permanent settler in Victoria was the founder of the wool industry in that colony. His portrait is in the historical collection at the Melbourne public library.

Affiliations
TS Henty, Australian Navy Cadets
Victorian Railways S class locomotive S302 Edward Henty

See also
Henty brothers
Whaling in Australia

References

External links
Images and transcripts of Edward Henty's journal and manifest of cargo on board the Thistle at the State Library of Victoria

Further reading
Jan Critchett, (1990), A distant field of murder: Western district frontiers, 1834–1848, Melbourne University Press  (Carlton, Vic. and Portland, Or.) 
Ian D Clark (1990) Aboriginal languages and clans: An historical atlas of western and central Victoria, 1800–1900, Dept. of Geography & Environmental Science, Monash University  (Melbourne),  
Ian D Clark (1995), Scars in the landscape: A register of massacre sites in western Victoria, 1803–1859, Australian Institute of Aboriginal and Torres Strait Islander Studies (Canberra), 
 Ian D Clark (2003) ‘That's my country belonging to me’ – Aboriginal land tenure and dispossession in nineteenth century Western Victoria, Ballarat Heritage Services, Ballarat.
 The Gunditjmara People with Gib Wettenhall, (2010) The People of Budj Bim: Engineers of aquaculture, builders of stone house settlements and warriors defending country, em Press, Heywood (Victoria)

1810 births
1878 deaths
People from Tarring, West Sussex
Portland, Victoria
Members of the Victorian Legislative Assembly
19th-century Australian politicians
Australian people in whaling
Australian pastoralists
Australian ship owners
Settlers of Victoria (Australia)
English emigrants to colonial Australia
19th-century Australian businesspeople